Cory Aston (born 1 March 1995) is an English professional rugby league footballer who plays as a  or  for the Sheffield Eagles in the Betfred Championship. 

Aston has previously played for the Sheffield Eagles in the Kingstone Press Championship. He moved to the Leeds Rhinos ahead of the 2017 Super League season, and played on loan for Featherstone Rovers and the Bradford Bulls in the Kingstone Press Championship. A move to the Castleford Tigers (Heritage № 991) saw his 2018 debut in the Super League, but also loans to his former club Sheffield in the Betfred Championship and the Newcastle Thunder during the 2019 Betfred League 1 season.

Background
Aston was born in Sheffield, Yorkshire, England.

Aston is the son of Sheffield Eagles head coach Mark Aston.

Career

Sheffield Eagles
He graduated from the Eagles' academy and made his début in 2013 after signing a five-year deal. He went on to play a total of 61 games for the Eagles, scoring 308 points in the process.

Leeds Rhinos
Having struggled on and off the pitch in 2016, Sheffield sold Aston to Super League side Leeds Rhinos for £75,000 on a three-year deal, beating off the likes of Wigan and Warrington for his signature. Aston signed a 2-year deal with the Rhinos, the plan was for him to provide cover for Danny McGuire. Aston did not make a single appearance for Leeds in 2017, as he spent most of the season on loan at Featherstone and then Bradford. Ahead of the 2018 season, Aston was released by the Rhinos.

Castleford Tigers
In December 2017, Aston signed a two-year deal for the 2017 Super League Finalists the Castleford Tigers. In late January, Aston agreed yet another loan deal to the Championship as he rejoined his father in Sheffield. He made his Super League debut in round 11 of the 2019 season vs Wakefield Trinity Wildcats, where he started at scrum-half and scored a try.

London Broncos
Aston joined the London Broncos ahead of the 2020 RFL Championship season.

Halifax Panthers
On 29 October 2021 it was reported that he had signed a two-year deal for Halifax Panthers in the RFL Championship In October 2022 it was announced that Aston would depart the club after just a single season.

Club statistics

References

External links

Castleford Tigers profile
Sheffield Eagles profile
SL profile

1995 births
Living people
Bradford Bulls players
Castleford Tigers players
English rugby league players
Featherstone Rovers players
Halifax R.L.F.C. players
Leeds Rhinos players
London Broncos players
Newcastle Thunder players
Rugby league five-eighths
Rugby league halfbacks
Rugby league players from Sheffield
Sheffield Eagles players